Tachina chaetaria is a species of fly in the genus Tachina of the family Tachinidae that is endemic to South America.

References

Insects described in 1836
Diptera of South America
chrysocephala